Cristoforo Moro (1390 – November 10, 1471) was the 67th Doge of Venice. He reigned from 1462 to 1471.

Family
The Moro family settled in Venice in the 5th century when Stephanus Maurus, a great-grandson of Maurus, built a church on the island of Murano. Cristoforo was the eleventh person from the family to be elected doge. His dogaressa was Cristina Sanudo.

Life
After graduating from university, Moro held various public offices. He was the Venetian ambassador to the Popes Eugene IV and Nicholas V. Saint Bernardino of Siena was said to have prophesied that Moro would one day become doge, and as the fulfillment of a solemn vow Moro had the Church of Saint Giobbe built and dedicated to Bernardino's memory. He bequeathed his fortune to various charitable organizations and foundations, including the Church of Saint Giobbe.

Doge
Moro's reign was marked by the beginning of a long war between Venice and the Turks. In 1463 Pope Pius II sent Moro a consecrated sword with the intention of convincing Venice to join the anti-Turk alliance. The reaction in Venice was initially hesitant as the Republic's main priority was their economic interests.

In April 1463, 10 years after the conquest of Constantinople, Turkish troops occupied the Venetian fortress of Argos in Greece. The Latin Patriarch Cardinal Johannes Bessarion traveled to Venice to call on the Republic to join the "defense of the faith"; i.e. join the war against the Turks. That same year a coalition was formed between Venice, Hungary and the Albanian prince Skanderbeg with the blessing of the Pope to counter the threat of Sultan Mehmed II's aggressive policy of conquest. The coalition succeeded in temporarily halting Turkish expansion; however, the new territorial limits acquired by the Turks in their conquests had by and large been accepted.

In 1469 the Venetian fleet commander Niccolò Canal retook the town of Ainos in Thrace, but he was not able to defend the island of Negroponte (Euboea), a major granary of Venice, from Turkish attack. Euboea was conquered by the Sultan while inflicting enormous losses on the Venetian forces.

The Republic faced further threats from the northern Italian cities who coveted Venetian land, as well as from the French king Louis XI who was seeking to expand Lombardy at the expense of Venice.

Tomb
Moro's tomb is located in the sanctuary of the Church of Saint Giobbe. The tomb is above ground, covered with a marble tombstone.

References

Bibliography 

1390 births
1471 deaths
15th-century Doges of Venice
Ambassadors of the Republic of Venice to the Holy See
Medieval Italian diplomats
Republic of Venice people of the Ottoman–Venetian Wars
15th-century diplomats